Les Transmutations imperceptibles, sold in the United States as The Imperceptible Transmutations and in Britain as Imperceptible Transformation, is a 1904 French short silent film by Georges Méliès. It was sold by Méliès's Star Film Company and is numbered 556–557 in its catalogues.

Méliès stars in the film as the magician, who is identified in the Star Film catalogues as a prince. The special effects were created with substitution splices and dissolves.

References

External links
 

French black-and-white films
Films directed by Georges Méliès
French silent short films